The 355th Tactical Airlift Squadron is an inactive United States Air Force unit.  Its last assignment was with 906th Tactical Airlift Group stationed at Rickenbacker Air National Guard Base, Ohio.   It was inactivated on 1 July 1982.

History
Activated in early 1942 as a B-24 Liberator Operational Training Unit (OTU), later becoming a Replacement Training Unit (RTU) for deployed combat units, assigned to II Bomber Command.   Inactivated in April 1944 when heavy bomber training ended.

Re-dgesignated as a B-29 Superfortress very heavy bombardment Squadron under Second Air Force 1 April 1944 at Dalhart Army Airfield, Texas.  Initially equipped with B-17 Flying Fortresses for training, due to shortage of B-29 Superfortresses.    Moved to Harvard Army Airfield, Nebraska, in August 1944 and equipped with B-29B limited production aircraft.

After completion of training deployed to Central Pacific Area (CPA), assigned to XXI Bomber Command, Northwest Field (Guam) for operational missions.  B-29Bs were standard production aircraft stripped of most defensive guns to increase speed and bomb load, The tail gun was aimed and fired automatically by the new AN/APG-15B radar fire control system that detected the approaching enemy plane and made all the necessary calculations.

Mission of the squadron was the strategic bombardment of the Japanese Home Islands.  Dntered combat on 16 June 1945 with a bombing raid against an airfield on Moen. Flew first mission against the Japanese home islands on 26 June 1945 and afterwards operated principally against the enemy's petroleum industry.  Flew primarily low-level, fast attacks at night using a mixture of high-explosive and incendiary bombs to attack targets.

Flew last combat mission on 15 August 1945, later flew in "Show of Force" mission on 2 September 1945 over Tokyo Bay during formal Japanese Surrender. Inactivated on Guam 15 April 1946, personnel returned to the United States and aircraft sent to storage in Southwest United States.

It trained for C-54 airlift operations from 1949 to 1950 and for troop carrier missions from 1952 to 1959. Reactivated in 1963 to organize, recruit and train Air Force Reserve personnel to provide tactical airlift of airborne forces, their equipment and supplies and delivery of these forces and materials by airdrop, landing or cargo extraction systems. Initially equipped with C-119 Flying Boxcars for Tactical Air Command airlift operations.

Replaced C-119s with C-123 Provider assault transport in 1967, began training with special operations forces when parent 302d Tactical Airlift Wing was redesignated as a Special Operations Wing in 1970. Inactivated in 1975 as part of post-Vietnam War drawdown.

Reactivated in 1981 as a UC-123K Provider reserve squadron at Rickenbacker ANGB, Ohio for aerial spraying operations. Inactivated in 1982 when host unit was realigned into a fighter group at Wright-Patterson AFB.

Operations
 Campaigns: Air Offensive; Japan; Eastern Mandates; Western Pacific.

Lineage
 Constituted as the 355 Bombardment Squadron (Heavy) on 28 January 1942
 Activated on 1 June 1942
 Inactivated on 10 April 1944
 Redesignated 355 Bombardment Squadron, Very Heavy on 27 June 1944
 Activated on 7 July 1944
 Inactivated on 15 April 1946
 Redesignated 355th Troop Carrier Squadron, Medium on 16 May 1949
 Activated in the reserve on 27 June 1949
 Redesignated 355th Troop Carrier Squadron, Heavy on 28 January 1950
 Ordered to active service on 1 June 1951
 Inactivated on 8 June 1951
 Redesignated 355th Troop Carrier Squadron, Medium on 26 May 1952
 Activated in the reserve on 14 June 1952
 Ordered to active duty on 28 October 1962
 Released from active duty on 28 November 1962
 Redesignated 355th Tactical Airlift Squadron on 1 July 1967
 Redesignated 355th Special Operations Squadron on 25 January 1970
 Redesignated 355th Tactical Airlift Squadron on 25 July 1971
 Inactivated on 1 July 1982

Assignments
 302d Bombardment Group, 1 June 1942 – 10 April 194
 331st Bombardment Group, 7 July 1944 – 15 April 1946
 302d Troop Carrier Group, 27 June 1949 – 8 June 1951
 302d Troop Carrier Group, 14 June 1952
 302d Troop Carrier Wing, 14 April 1959
 906th Troop Carrier Group (later 906th Tactical Airlift Group, 906th Special Operations Group, 906th Tactical Airlift Group), 11 February 1963
 302d Tactical Airlift Wing, 1 Septrmber 1975
 906th Tactical Airlift Group, 1 April 1981 – 1 July 1982

Stations

 Geiger Field, Washington, 1 June 1942
 Davis–Monthan Field, Arizona, 23 June 1942
 Wendover Field, Utah, 30 July 1942
 Pueblo Army Air Base, Colorado, 30 September 1942
 Davis–Monthan Field, Arizona, 1 December 1942
 Clovis Army Air Field, New Mexico, 29 January 1943
 Langley Field, Virginia, 17 December 1943
 Chatham Army Air Field, Georgia, 27 Jan-10 Apr 1944
 Dalhart Army Air Field, Texas, 7 July 1944

 McCook Army Air Field, Nebraska, 22 Nov 1944 – 8 Apr 1945
 Northwest Field, Guam, Northern Mariana Islands, 12 May 1945 – 15 Apr 1946
 Clinton County Air Force Base, Ohio, 14 June 1952 – 14 April 1959; 11 February 1963
 Lockbourne Air Force Base (later Rickenbacker Air Force Base), Ohio, 2 August 1971 – 1 July 1982

Aircraft

 Consolidated B-24 Liberator (1942–1944)
 Boeing B-17 Flying Fortress (1944)
 Boeing B-29B Superfortress (1945–1946)
 Curtiss C-46 Commando (1952–1957)

 Fairchild C-119 Flying Boxcar, 1956–1967
 Fairchild C-123 Provider, 1967–1982

References

Notes
 Explanatory notes

 Citations

Bibliography

 
 
 
 

Airlift squadrons of the United States Air Force